The title Duke of Gordon has been created once in the Peerage of Scotland and again in the Peerage of the United Kingdom.

The Dukedom, named after the Clan Gordon, was first created for the 4th Marquess of Huntly, who on 3 November 1684 was created Duke of Gordon, Marquess of Huntly, Earl of Huntly and Enzie (all three of which he already held by an older creation), Viscount of Inverness, and Lord Strathaven, Balmore, Auchindoun, Garthie and Kincardine. On 2 July 1784, the 4th Duke was created Earl of Norwich, in the County of Norfolk, and Baron Gordon, of Huntley in the County of Gloucester, in the Peerage of Great Britain. The principal family seat was Gordon Castle. The Dukedom became extinct in 1836, along with all the titles created in 1684 and 1784.

Most of the Gordon estates passed to the son of the 5th Duke's eldest sister, the 5th Duke of Richmond, whose main seat was Goodwood House in Sussex. In 1876 his son, the 6th Duke of Richmond and Lennox, was created Duke of Gordon, of Gordon Castle in Scotland, and Earl of Kinrara, in the County of Inverness. Thus, the Duke holds four dukedoms (including the French title Duke of Aubigny in the defunct Peerage of France), more than any other person in the realm.

Dukes of Gordon, first Creation (1684)
Other titles: Marquess of Huntly (1599), Marquess of Huntly (1684), Earl of Huntly (1445), Earl of Enzie (1599), Earl of Huntly and Enzie and Viscount of Inverness (1684), Lord Gordon of Badenoch (1599) and Lord Badenoch, Lochaber, Strathavon, Balmore, Auchidon, Garthie and Kincardine (1684)
George Gordon, 1st Duke of Gordon (1649–1716) was until 1684 merely Marquess of Huntly
Alexander Gordon, 2nd Duke of Gordon (c. 1678–1728), only son of the 1st Duke
Cosmo George Gordon, 3rd Duke of Gordon (c. 1720–1752), eldest son of the 2nd Duke
Other title (4th Duke): Earl of Norwich and Baron Gordon of Huntly, in the county of Gloucester (GB, 1784) and Baron Mordaunt (En, 1529)
Alexander Gordon, 4th Duke of Gordon (1743–1827), eldest son of the 3rd Duke
George Duncan Gordon, 5th Duke of Gordon (1770–1836), elder son of the 4th Duke

Dukes of Gordon, second Creation (1876)
Other titles: Duke of Richmond (1675), Duke of Lennox (1675), Earl of March (1675), Earl of Darnley (1675), Earl of Kinrara, in the county of Inverness (1876), Baron of Settrington, in the county of York (1675) and Lord of Torboulton (1675)
Charles Henry Gordon-Lennox, 6th Duke of Richmond, 6th Duke of Lennox, 1st Duke of Gordon (1818–1903), eldest son of the 5th Duke of Richmond, himself nephew of the above 5th Duke of Gordon
Charles Henry Gordon-Lennox, 7th Duke of Richmond, 7th Duke of Lennox, 2nd Duke of Gordon (1845–1928), eldest son of the 6th Duke
Charles Henry Gordon-Lennox, 8th Duke of Richmond, 8th Duke of Lennox, 3rd Duke of Gordon (1870–1935), eldest son of the 7th Duke
Charles Henry Gordon-Lennox, Lord Settrington (1899–1919), eldest son of the 8th Duke (at that point Earl of March), died without issue
Frederick Charles Gordon-Lennox, 9th Duke of Richmond, 9th Duke of Lennox, 4th Duke of Gordon (1904–1989), second son of the 8th Duke
Charles Henry Gordon-Lennox, 10th Duke of Richmond, 10th Duke of Lennox, 5th Duke of Gordon (1929-2017), eldest son of the 9th Duke
Charles Gordon-Lennox, 11th Duke of Richmond, 11th Duke of Lennox, 6th Duke of Gordon  (b. 1955), only son of the 10th Duke
the duke's heir apparent: Charles Henry Gordon-Lennox (b. 1994), the 11th Duke's eldest son

Family Tree

See also
Gordon Highlanders
Gordon Riots
Duke of Richmond
Duke of Lennox

References

External links
Duke of Gordon

Extinct dukedoms in the Peerage of Scotland
Dukedoms in the Peerage of the United Kingdom
 
1684 establishments in Scotland
1836 disestablishments in Scotland
1876 establishments in the United Kingdom
Noble titles created in 1684
Noble titles created in 1876
Noble titles created for UK MPs